The lands of Sweden are three traditional and historical regions of the country, each consisting of several provinces. The division into lands goes back to the foundation of modern Sweden, when Götaland, the land of the Geats, merged with Svealand, the land of the Swedes, to form the country, while Norrland and Österland (the latter now Finland) were added later. The lands have no administrative function but are still seen by many Swedes as an important part of their identity.

Subdivision
 Götaland (Gothenland or Gothia, "Land of the Geats") is the southernmost, most densely populated part, consisting of ten provinces.
 Svealand (Swealand, "Land of the Swedes") is the central, and smallest of the three lands, with six provinces; the administrative centre of Sweden has been situated here at least since the late Middle Ages.
 Norrland (literally "Northland") is the northernmost, and largest, of the three lands, covering 60 percent of the total land area of Sweden, with nine provinces. The three northernmost provinces are often referred to as Övre (Upper) Norrland, while the rest of the provinces are referred to as Nedre (Lower) Norrland.

The lands have no administrative functions or coats of arms, but are in common use when referring to different parts of the country, including in all nationwide weather reports in Swedish media.

Areas and populations of the lands:

Historical lands
 
Sweden was historically divided into the four lands: Götaland (with exception of Scania, Blekinge, Halland and Bohuslän until the 17th Century), Svealand, Norrland and Österland. Large parts of Norrland were only inhabited by the Sami people and the border towards Norway was unclear in the far north.

 Österland (literally Eastland) is an old name for southern Finland. The term has been obsolete since the 15th century and is virtually unknown in Sweden today. In most dictionaries, "österlandet" simply means the orient.
 Norrland was the name for the annexed lands to the north on both sides of the Gulf of Bothnia.
 In Sweden's prehistoric times, Sweden was largely limited to Svealand and southern Norrland, while Götaland was mentioned as a rival kingdom, and stories of Swedish-Geatish wars survive in the Anglo-Saxon epic Beowulf. Eventually, the two countries were united under one crown, though it is a matter of debate when, as historians have claimed that it happened as early as the 6th Century AD and as late as the 13th Century AD. 
In the Second Treaty of Brömsebro (1645) Denmark-Norway ceded the Norwegian provinces of Jämtland and Härjedalen to Sweden. These provinces are part of Norrland. In the Treaty of Roskilde (1658), Denmark-Norway ceded Scania, Blekinge and Halland (Skåneland) and Bohuslän to Sweden. These provinces are since then part of Götaland.

After the Finnish War (1808–1809), the eastern part of Sweden was ceded to Russia, thus becoming the Imperial Russian Grand Duchy of Finland, with Norrland divided between these two states. The Swedish portion of Norrland still represents more than half of Sweden's territory; it remains, however, sparsely populated compared to the south and middle.

See also
 Sweden-Finland
 Dominions of Sweden
 Provinces of Sweden
 Old Finland
 Historical provinces of Finland
 Subdivisions of the Nordic countries
 Lands of Denmark

References

Notes

External links

 
Sweden
Former subdivisions of Sweden